Hell's Faire is the fourth book in John Ringo's Legacy of the Aldenata series. Earth has been fighting the Posleen invasion, and suffered tremendous casualties. New weapons and tactics are being employed by the humans, but the Posleen are adapting as well.

References

Novels by John Ringo
Legacy of the Aldenata
2003 American novels